Hetman of Ukraine is a former historic government office and political institution of Ukraine that is equivalent to a head of state or a monarch.

Brief history 
As a head of state the position was established at first by Bohdan Khmelnytsky during the Cossack Hetmanate in the mid-17th century. During that period the office was electoral. Later in the late 18th century it was successfully liquidated by the Russian government during the expansion of the Russian territory towards the Black Sea coast.

The position and title was reestablished in 1918 by the Ukrainian General Pavlo Skoropadskyi, a descendant of the former Hetman of Zaporizhian Host Ivan Skoropadskyi. The Law on the Provisional State System of Ukraine was announced at the session of the Central Council of Ukraine on 29 April 1918 which laid a legal groundwork for the new position. Pavlo Skoropadskyi transformed Ukraine into the autocratic Ukrainian State under the protectorate of the Central Powers, while expelling the Bolshevik forces of the Russian SFSR. During his term the Communist Party was prohibited on the territory of Ukraine for the first time. After the uprising led by the Directorate of Ukraine, Pavlo Skoropadskyi surrendered the title, transferring the state power to the Cabinet of Ministers of Ukraine and going into exile to Germany.

After the establishment of the Ukrainian Soviet Socialist Republic, members of the Skoropadskyi family established the Hetmanate movement that sought the recreation of the office of Hetman with the Royal House of Skoropadskyi.

See also 
 List of leaders of Ukraine
 Hetmans of Ukrainian Cossacks

External links 
 Last Hetman. Dream comes true.... National Cinematheque of Ukraine. 2008.

Heads of state of Ukraine
Political history of Ukraine
Presidency of Ukraine
Ukrainian monarchy
Ukrainian State